William L. Cobb (1917 – December 17, 1990) was an American designer and engineer of roller coasters, as the founder and head of William Cobb & Associates. He is particularly noted for his work on designing and relocating several major wooden roller coasters in the 1970s and 1980s. A number of these coasters were world-record holders at the time of their opening.

On the subject of roller coaster design, Cobb has been quoted as saying, "You have to be a little bit mean. Sometimes you have to be a little bit sneaky. You get them going on a nice straight track and they think 'This looks smooth,' and then you dip it down a little to give them a good jolt. Or you have it so that when they go over a hill it looks like they're going to get their heads chopped off at the bottom."

List of roller coasters

William Cobb designed 11 roller coasters around the world.

Notes

Roller coaster designers
Place of birth missing
Place of death missing
1917 births
1990 deaths